Ricardo Baeza Rodríguez is a Chilean mathematician who works as a professor at the University of Talca. He earned his Ph.D. in 1970 from Saarland University, under the joint supervision of Robert W. Berger and Manfred Knebusch. His research interest is in number theory.

Baeza became a member of the Chilean Academy of Sciences in 1983. He was the 2009 winner of the Chilean National Prize for Exact Sciences. In 2012, he became one of the inaugural fellows of the American Mathematical Society, the only Chilean to be so honored.

References

Year of birth missing (living people)
Living people
Number theorists
Saarland University alumni
Academic staff of the University of Talca
Fellows of the American Mathematical Society
20th-century Chilean mathematicians
21st-century Chilean mathematicians